Live From The Inside is a live DVD by the American hard rock band Shinedown, recorded on December 31, 2004 at the House of Blues in Myrtle Beach, SC released on August 23, 2005.

Track listing
 Intro
 In Memory
 Stranger Inside
 Fly from the Inside
 Better Version
 Burning Bright
 Crying Out
 Lost in the Crowd
 No More Love
 Simple Man
 45
 Left Out
 Band Interview
 Simple Man (Music Video Version)
 45 (Music Video Version)

Photo cover and DVD gallery by photographer James Patrick Cooper (www.coopphoto.com)

External links
Shinedown's official website

Shinedown albums
Live video albums
2005 live albums
2005 video albums
Atlantic Records live albums
Atlantic Records video albums